The Tejas Express is a semi-high speed fully air-conditioned train introduced by Indian Railways. It features modern onboard facilities with doors which are operated automatically. Tejas means "sharp", "lustre", or "brilliance" in many Indian languages. It is one of 3 semi-high speed trains running in India, the others being the Vande Bharat Express and the Gatimaan Express.

History

The inaugural run of Tejas Express was on 24 May 2017 from Chhatrapati Shivaji Maharaj Terminus, Maharashtra to Karmali, Goa. It covered 552 km in 8 hours and 30 minutes. On 1 March 2019, the second Tejas Express of the country was flagged off between Chennai Egmore and Madurai Junction by Prime Minister Narendra Modi. It covered 497 km in 6 hours and 30 minutes.

Tejas Express on New Delhi – Chandigarh route is expected to commence its services soon after its first announcement in 2016 whereas the Lucknow – New Delhi route running currently as the train has been included in the current Trains at Glance, the official train time-table booklet, with "Date of Introduction to be declared" condition and at the same time news websites have quoted railway officials saying a hold of three years. Meanwhile, the train service which was expected to be launched on Mumbai – Surat and New Delhi- Jalandhar route has also been put on hold.

Lucknow – New Delhi Tejas Express, which was inaugurated on 4 October 2019, is India's first train operated by private operators, IRCTC, a subsidiary of Indian Railways.

The Ahmedabad – Mumbai Tejas express, also operated by IRCTC, was inaugurated on 17 January 2020.

Recently Agartala – Anand Vihar Rajdhani Express was upgraded to Tejas style sleeper rake and was named as Tejas Rajdhani special. This train leaves Agartala on Monday and arrives at Anand Vihar on Wednesday morning and leaves Anand Vihar on Wednesday evening and arrives in Agartala on Friday. Earliar Rajdhani used to run on this slot between Agartala and Anand Vihar Terminus (Delhi). This train became the country's first sleeper Tejas express. The Mumbai Rajdhani Express, and the Rajendra Nagar Patna Rajdhani Express are also both now run with Tejas LHB coach, replacing the former Rajdhani LHB coach. Indian Railways Has started removing entertainment screens from Tejas Express and Shatabdi Express Anubhuti Class because passengers were damaging the entertainment screens.

Technical specifications

The coaches of first Tejas Express of India, which runs between Chhatrapati Shivaji Maharaj Terminus (CSMT), Mumbai and Karmali are manufactured at Rail Coach Factory, Kapurthala in Kapurthala district of Punjab. The coaches of second Tejas express, which runs between Chennai Egmore and Madurai, were manufactured at Integral Coach Factory, Chennai. The train is designed to run at a maximum speed of  but the maximum operating speed allowed is  due to track and safety constraints.

There are 14 non-executive chair cars and they can seat up to 72 passengers each in 3+2 configuration. The coaches have energy-efficient LED lights and digital destination display boards. It also has two executive chair cars in 2+2 configuration. The executive chair cars have a seating capacity of 56 passengers with adjustable head-rests, arm support and leg support. The leg support is not available in non-executive chair cars. The seats on tejas express are also very comfortable in terms of height on the contrary of regular AC chair car seats. 

Coaches have bio-vacuum toilets, water level indicators, tap sensors, hand dryers, integrated braille displays, LED TV for each passenger with phone sockets, local cuisine, celebrity chef menu, WiFi, tea & coffee vending machines, magazines, snack tables, CCTV cameras, fire & smoke detection and suppression system. The fares will be 20% to 30% more than Shatabdi fares. The Tejas Express has redesigned seats with eco-leather. Toilets are equipped with soap dispensers, touch-less water taps, odour-control systems and occupancy indicators. Doors are centrally controlled.

WDP-3A (diesel-electric) locomotives were used to haul the initial Tejas Express coaches. As of 2020, new assymetric bodied
WAP-5 (electric) locomotives with Tejas Express livery are used to haul the new trains.

Routes

Tejas-Rajdhani Express 
Indian Railways started to upgrade Rajdhani coaches to Tejas coaches known as the Tejas-Rajdhani Express. This replaced its traditional LHB Rajdhani coaches.

See also

References

External links 
 Indian Railways

Railway services introduced in 2017

Railway services introduced in 2016
2017 establishments in India